Asthenotricha tripogonias is a moth in the family Geometridae first described by Louis Beethoven Prout in 1926. It is found on Réunion.

References

Moths described in 1926
Asthenotricha
Moths of Réunion
Endemic fauna of Réunion